Vancouveria is a small group of plants belonging to the barberry family described as a genus in 1834. The three plants in this genus are known generally as inside-out flowers, and they are endemic to the West Coast of the United States. The genus was named after George Vancouver, English navigator and explorer.

Species

Vancouveria chrysantha Greene – golden inside-out flower – California (Siskiyou + Del Norte Counties), Oregon (Curry + Josephine Counties)
Vancouveria hexandra (Hook.) C.Morren & Decne. – white inside-out flower – northwestern California (from Napa to Siskiyou), western Oregon, southwestern Washington
Vancouveria planipetala Calloni – redwood inside-out flower – California as far south as Monterey County, southwestern Oregon

References

External links

 
Berberidaceae genera
Flora of the West Coast of the United States
Taxa named by Joseph Decaisne
Taxa named by Charles François Antoine Morren